Michael Harry Tatham  (born 2 July 1965) is a British diplomat, serving since January 2018 as the deputy British Ambassador to the United States. Following the resignation of Kim Darroch in July 2019, he became chargé d'affaires ad interim.

Tatham is the son of David Tatham, who also served in the diplomatic service. He joined the FCO in 1987, and in his early career served in Prague and Sofia as well as in ministerial private office, first for Jeremy Hanley from 1995 to 1996, and then from 1999 for the Prime Minister, Tony Blair, under the Private Secretary for Foreign Affairs to the Prime Minister, first John Sawers and then Francis Campbell, until 2002.

Tatham went back in Prague as deputy head of mission for 2002–2005, as Head of the FCO's Western Balkans group, and then as British ambassador to Bosnia and Herzegovina from 2008 until 2011. After four years as political counsellor at UKMIS in New York, Tatham was the Foreign Office's Director for Eastern Europe and Central Asia from 2015 to 2017.

Tatham was appointed Companion of the Order of St Michael and St George (CMG) in the 2020 Birthday Honours for services to British foreign policy.

References

External links 

 Tatham's page on gov.uk

Living people
1965 births
British diplomats
Alumni of Merton College, Oxford
People educated at Oundle School
Companions of the Order of St Michael and St George